Eyre is a settlement on the eastern shore of Loch Snizort Beag on the northern coast of Skye in Scotland.

The two Eyre standing stones are situated next to Loch Eyre. It is said that there was once a third stone here, although there is now no trace.

References

External links

Canmore - Eyre, Skye site record

Populated places in the Isle of Skye